Capron v. Van Noorden, 6 U.S. (2 Cranch) 126 (1804), was a United States Supreme Court case in which the Court allowed a plaintiff to dismiss a case that he had lost at trial because of a lack of diversity jurisdiction, leaving the plaintiff free to bring the case again in North Carolina.

Capron sued Van Noorden for negligently injuring him.

The plaintiff Capron argued that the federal court wasn't the proper court to hear the case. This argument ensued the decision of the federal court in favor of the defendant Van Noorden.

References

Further reading
.

External links
 

1804 in United States case law
Diversity jurisdiction case law
United States Supreme Court cases
United States Supreme Court cases of the Marshall Court